The 2013 Karjala Tournament was played between 7–10 November 2013. The Czech Republic, Finland, Sweden and Russia played a round-robin for a total of three games per team and six games in total. Five of the matches were played in the Hartwall Areena in Helsinki, Finland, and one match in the Läkeröl Arena in Gävle, Sweden. The tournament was won by Finland. The tournament was part of 2013–14 Euro Hockey Tour.

Standings

Games
All times are local.
Helsinki – (Eastern European Time – UTC+2) Gävle – (Central European Time – UTC+1)

References

2013–14 in Swedish ice hockey
2013–14 Euro Hockey Tour
Karjala Tournament
November 2013 sports events in Europe
2010s in Helsinki
Sports competitions in Gävle